Theliderma sparsa, the Appalachian monkey-face pearly mussel or Appalachian monkeyface, is a species of freshwater mussel, an aquatic bivalve mollusk in the family Unionidae, the river mussels.

This species is endemic to western Virginia and eastern Tennessee in the Appalachia region, in the Southeastern United States.

It is critically endangered due to pollution of the rivers in which it lives. Being a detritivore, the mussel absorbs the pollutants which contaminate the river as it feeds.

Distribution
There are two to three populations remaining. In the Clinch River of Virginia there is a small, isolated population. A population in the upper Powell River in Tennessee is nearly gone. These occurrences may not be viable. All other occurrences have been extirpated.

References

Molluscs of the United States
Ecology of the Appalachian Mountains
Endemic fauna of Tennessee
Endemic fauna of Virginia
Critically endangered fauna of the United States
sparsa
Bivalves described in 1841
Taxonomy articles created by Polbot